Miano is a surname. It is a southern Italian surname, which originated both as a shortened form of given names such as Emiliano or Damiano, as well as a toponymic surname from various settlements including Miano in Naples,  in Parma, Miano in Teramo, Miane in Veneto, and Mian in Belluno. In Italy, 899 families bore the surname Miano, with slightly less than half located in Sardinia. The 2010 United States census found 1,643 people with the surname Miano, making it the 17,239th-most-common name in the country. This represented an increase from 1,531 (17,101st-most-common) in the 2000 census. In both censuses, roughly nine-tenths of the bearers of the surname identified as non-Hispanic white.

Notable people with the surname include:

Laura Miano (born 1959), Italian sprinter
Léonora Miano (born 1973), Cameroonian writer
Mike Miano (born 1973), American football player
Rebecca Miano (born 1966), Kenyan lawyer
Rich Miano (born 1962), American football player
Robert Miano (born 1942), American actor
Sarah Emily Miano (born 1974), American writer

References

Italian-language surnames
Surnames of Kenyan origin